Ashibusa flavalba is a moth of the family Cosmopterigidae. It is found in China.

References

Moths described in 2009
Cosmopteriginae
Moths of Asia